Lisa Raymond and Rennae Stubbs were the defending champions but lost in the semifinals to Monica Seles and Natasha Zvereva.

Elena Likhovtseva and Ai Sugiyama won in the final 7–5, 4–6, 6–2 against Seles and Zvereva.

Seeds
Champion seeds are indicated in bold text while text in italics indicates the round in which those seeds were eliminated.

 Martina Hingis /  Jana Novotná (semifinals)
 Alexandra Fusai /  Nathalie Tauziat (first round)
 Lisa Raymond /  Rennae Stubbs (semifinals)
 Yayuk Basuki /  Caroline Vis (first round)

Draw

External links
 1998 Advanta Championships of Philadelphia Doubles Draw

Advanta Championships of Philadelphia
1998 WTA Tour